Franklin Resources, Inc. is an American multinational holding company that, together with its subsidiaries, is referred to as Franklin Templeton; it is a global investment firm founded in New York City in 1947 as Franklin Distributors, Inc. It is listed on the New York Stock Exchange under the ticker symbol BEN, in honor of Benjamin Franklin, for whom the company is named, and who was admired by founder Rupert Johnson Sr. In 1973, the company's headquarters moved from New York to San Mateo, California. As of October 12, 2020, Franklin Templeton held US$1.4 trillion in assets under management (AUM) on behalf of private, professional and institutional investors.

History

The company was founded in 1947 in New York by Rupert H. Johnson Sr., who ran a successful retail brokerage firm from an office on Wall Street. He named the company for American polymath Benjamin Franklin because Franklin espoused frugality and prudence when it came to saving and investing. The company's first line of mutual funds, Franklin Custodian Funds, was a series of conservatively managed equity and bond funds designed to appeal to most investors.

After Rupert Sr. retired, his son, Charles B. Johnson (Charlie), took over as president and chief executive officer in 1957 at age 24. At that time, the funds had total assets under management of US$2.5 million. Rupert Johnson, Jr., Charlie's brother, joined the company in 1965.

Franklin went public in 1971. In 1973, the company acquired Winfield & Company, a San Mateo, California-based investment firm, and moved Franklin's offices from New York to California. The combined organization had close to US$250 million in assets under management and approximately 60 employees. In 1979, Franklin Money Fund began a growth surge that made it Franklin's first billion-dollar fund and launched the company's significant asset growth in the 1980s.

Starting in 1980, the company's total assets under management doubled (or nearly doubled) every year for the next six years. The company's stock began trading on the New York Stock Exchange in 1986. In the same year, the company opened its first office outside North America in Taiwan. In 1988, Franklin acquired L.F. Rothschild Fund Management Company. Assets under management for Franklin grew from just over US$2 billion in 1982 to more than US$40 billion in 1989 (the crash of 1987 had little impact on Franklin's income and bond funds).

In October 1992, Franklin acquired Templeton, Galbraith & Hansberger Ltd. for a reported cost of $913 million, leading to the common name Franklin Templeton. Mutual fund pioneer Sir John Templeton was the owner of Templeton, Galbraith & Hansberger Ltd together with his son Dr. John Templeton and John Galbraith who together owned 70% of the firm.

In November 1996, Heine Securities Corporation, known for the Mutual Series of funds, merged into the Franklin Templeton complex. In October 2000, Franklin acquired Bissett Funds to increase its Canadian presence, and Bissett remains a key brand from Franklin in the Canadian market. The Fiduciary Trust Company was acquired by Franklin Templeton in April 2001.

Fiduciary Trust Company International, a member of the Franklin family, maintained an office of over 650 employees in Two World Trade Center at the time of the September 11 attacks in 2001. 87 employees died in the collapse.

The firm has specialized expertise across a full range of asset classes. It offers products under the Franklin, Templeton, Mutual Series and Fiduciary brand names, among others. Like other large investment companies, the firm offers a wide variety of funds but is traditionally best known for bond funds under the Franklin brand, international funds under the Templeton brand, and value funds under the Mutual Series brand.

In April 2007, Franklin Resources was 445th in the Fortune 500, and 7th overall among securities companies. The same month, USA Today listed BEN stock as the top stock pick for the last 25 years based on returns, claiming it is up 64,224% since 1982. As of July 31, 2008, Franklin Resources, Inc. managed over $570 billion in total assets worldwide. In February 2009, Barron's Magazine called Franklin Templeton "King of the Decade" among fund families over the ten-year period ending in 2008.

In 2013, Charles Johnson retired as chairman and his son Greg Johnson became chairman of the board, CEO and president.

In 2019, the firm acquired Benefit Street Partners, an alternative credit investment group.

In 2020, Jennifer M. Johnson became CEO and President of the firm and Greg Johnson became Executive Chairman.

In July 2020, Franklin Templeton acquired Legg Mason, Inc. and its multiple specialist investment managers, establishing Franklin Templeton as one of the world's largest independent, specialized global investment managers with a combined $1.4 trillion in assets under management (AUM) across one of the broadest ranges of high-quality investment teams in the industry. The combined footprint significantly deepens Franklin Templeton's presence in key geographies and creates an expansive investment platform that is well balanced between institutional and retail client AUM.

In November 2021, Franklin Templeton announced its acquisition of Lexington Partners in a $1.75billion cash deal. The acquisition completed in April 2022.

In January 2022, Franklin Templeton acquired O'Shaughnessy Asset Management, an asset management firm founded by James O'Shaughnessy.

On May 31, 2022 it was announced that BNY Mellon Investment Management would sell Alcentra to Franklin Templeton and the transaction was completed on 1 November 2022.

Mutual funds and ETFs
Franklin Templeton has 455 open-ended mutual funds and seven closed-end funds. Included in these are 27 state and federal tax-free income funds, an area of investment pioneered by Franklin.

Prominent funds include the Templeton Growth Fund, Inc. (opened 1954), the Mutual Shares fund (opened 1949), and the Mutual Discovery Fund (opened 1992) and the Templeton Growth (Euro) Fund.

The Franklin Income Fund (FKINX) is a mutual fund in Morningstar's "conservative allocation" category and "large/value" style box. The fund was created in 1948 and has paid uninterrupted dividends for 60 years. The Franklin Income Fund is constructed primarily of dividend-paying stocks and bonds (2%).

Franklin Templeton launched its first exchange-traded fund (ETF) in 2013. This included 55 active, smart beta and passively managed ETFs in the U.S, with US$9.7 billion in assets under management in 2021.

In 2021, Franklin Templeton launched the first "tokenised" US mutual fund as a pilotit uses a blockchain to process transactions and record share ownership. The technology is provided by the Stellar network and Blockchain Administrator, a Delaware company. The OnChain US Government Money Fund pilot started with $1.4M of seed money and investment from employees. The automated administration can trade around the clock and removes the need for brokerages, which should result in a "highly significant decrease in fees". However, the fund actually has a high level of costs because of its small size and the fact that, as a pilot, it is maintaining traditional records in parallel.

See also

 List of mutual-fund families in Canada

References

External links

 

 Fiduciary Trust memorial page for employees who died in 9-11

Investment management companies of the United States
Mutual funds of the United States
Holding companies of the United States
Companies based in San Mateo, California
Financial services companies based in California
American companies established in 1947
Financial services companies established in 1947
Holding companies established in 1947
1947 establishments in New York City
Companies listed on the New York Stock Exchange
1970s initial public offerings